Aretas Akers-Douglas may refer to:

 Aretas Akers-Douglas, 1st Viscount Chilston (1851–1926), British Conservative politician
 Aretas Akers-Douglas, 2nd Viscount Chilston (1876–1947), British diplomat